Bastrop High School may refer to:
Bastrop High School (Bastrop, Louisiana), historic high school building listed on the National Register of Historic Places
Bastrop High School (Louisiana), in Bastrop, Louisiana, the current high school
Bastrop High School (Texas)